Weißhaupt or Weisshaupt is a German surname. Notable people with the surname include:

Marco Weißhaupt (born 1972), German footballer
Pamela Weisshaupt (born 1979), Swiss rower

See also
Weishaupt

German-language surnames